The 2018 PDC Unicorn Development Tour consisted of 20 darts tournaments on the 2018 PDC Pro Tour.

Prize money
The prize money for the Development Tour had a prize fund of £10,000 per event, with the winner of each event receiving £2,000.

This is how the prize money is divided:

April

Development Tour 1
Development Tour 1 was contested on Saturday 14 April 2018 at the Robin Park Tennis Centre in Wigan.

Development Tour 2
Development Tour 2 was contested on Saturday 14 April 2018 at the Robin Park Tennis Centre in Wigan.

Development Tour 3
Development Tour 3 was contested on Sunday 15 April 2018 at the Robin Park Tennis Centre in Wigan.

Development Tour 4
Development Tour 4 was contested on Sunday 15 April 2018 at the Robin Park Tennis Centre in Wigan.

May

Development Tour 5
Development Tour 5 was contested on Saturday 26 May 2018 at Halle 39 in Hildesheim.

Development Tour 6
Development Tour 6 was contested on Saturday 26 May 2018 at Halle 39 in Hildesheim.

Development Tour 7
Development Tour 7 was contested on Sunday 27 May 2018 at Halle 39 in Hildesheim.

Development Tour 8
Development Tour 8 was contested on Sunday 27 May 2018 at Halle 39 in Hildesheim.

June

Development Tour 9
Development Tour 9 was contested on Saturday 9 June 2018 at the Robin Park Tennis Centre in Wigan.

Development Tour 10
Development Tour 10 was contested on Saturday 9 June 2018 at the Robin Park Tennis Centre in Wigan.

Development Tour 11
Development Tour 11 was contested on Sunday 10 June 2018 at the Robin Park Tennis Centre in Wigan.

Development Tour 12
Development Tour 12 was contested on Sunday 10 June 2018 at the Robin Park Tennis Centre in Wigan.

September

Development Tour 13
Development Tour 13 was contested on Saturday 22 September 2018 at the East of England Showground in Peterborough.

Development Tour 14
Development Tour 14 was contested on Saturday 22 September 2018 at the East of England Showground in Peterborough.

Development Tour 15
Development Tour 15 was contested on Sunday 23 September 2018 at the East of England Showground in Peterborough.

Development Tour 16
Development Tour 16 was contested on Sunday 23 September 2018 at the East of England Showground in Peterborough.

November

Development Tour 17
Development Tour 17 was contested on Saturday 3 November 2018 at the Robin Park Tennis Centre in Wigan.

Development Tour 18
Development Tour 18 was contested on Saturday 3 November 2018 at the Robin Park Tennis Centre in Wigan.

Development Tour 19
Development Tour 19 was contested on Sunday 4 November 2018 at the Robin Park Tennis Centre in Wigan.

Development Tour 20
Development Tour 20 was contested on Sunday 4 November 2018 at the Robin Park Tennis Centre in Wigan.

References

2018 in darts
2018 PDC Pro Tour